Galician Nationalist Vanguard (VNG, Vangarda Nazonalista Galega in Galician language) was small independentist political party created in Galiza on July 25, 1933 .

History
Formed around Álvaro de las Casas and some dissidents of the Partido Galeguista, disenchanted with the autonomic slowdown caused by the CEDA and Radical Republican Party of the Spanish Second Republic and liked with the scouting movement Ultreya. The organ of expression of the VNG was Máis! (More!). The party stopped its activity in late 1934.

References
 Castro, X. (1985): O galeguismo na encrucillada republicana. Deputación provincial, Ourense Chapter 5: Vangarda Nazonalista Galega authorized version here.  
 Beramendi, X.G. (2007): De provincia a nación. Historia do galeguismo político. Xerais, Vigo 

History of Galicia (Spain)
Galician nationalist parties
Left-wing nationalist parties